Golshan Garden is in the town of Tabas . This garden is one of the important gardens in Iran.

This park which currently is a public park and Tabas' recreational points has an area of 8 hectare.

The Golshan Garden is located in the two salt deserts of Iran with the main one located between the Lut and Kavir Deserts.

Inside this garden where has been developed in compliance to Iranian garden architecture Iranian garden architecture , there are two crossed water streams and Golshan Garden of Tabas is one of the rare Gardens in Iran because there is always permanent running water flowing. Many fruit trees on this eight-acre monument had created unique nature. Various species of plants in the garden with different weather climates, like plants for certain cold regions alongside the palms which grow only in tropical areas can be found there.

At center point of this garden, there is a pond where is habitat of two pelicans and these birds are very familiar with visitors which this attitude is one of features of this garden.

History
The age of this garden dates back to Zand and Qajar eras.
This garden has been constructed by order of Mirza Hassan Khan who was the third appointed governor of Tabas by Nader Shah Afshar at Afshariyeh era.

See also
Persian garden
Persian architecture

References

Gardens in Iran
Tabas County